Binə may refer to:
Binə, Baku, Azerbaijan
Binə, Khojavend, Azerbaijan